Werner Schachten (born 16 September 1954) is a retired German football midfielder.

References

External links
 

1954 births
Living people
German footballers
Bundesliga players
VfL Bochum players
Association football midfielders